Pawan Kumar (born 28 October 1972) is an Indian former cricketer. He played two first-class matches for Hyderabad in 1995/96.

See also
 List of Hyderabad cricketers

References

External links
 

1972 births
Living people
Indian cricketers
Hyderabad cricketers
Cricketers from Hyderabad, India